The Rajagiriya Flyover (also referred to as the Rajagiriya Bridge) is a flyover built over Sri Jayawardenepura Mawatha in Rajagiriya, Sri Lanka. It is the longest flyover in the country. Initial designing and construction was conducted by Access Engineering on 6 June 2016, with the flyover officially opening to the public on  during an inaugural ceremony with the presence of the President of Sri Lanka Maithripala Sirisena.

See also 
 List of A-Grade highways in Sri Lanka

References

External links 
 
 

Bridges in Colombo District